The whitespotted toadfish (Sanopus astrifer) is a species of fish in the family Batrachoididae. It is endemic to Belize.

References

http://marinebio.org/species.asp?id=5406

Sanopus
Fish of Central America
Vertebrates of Belize
Endemic fauna of Belize
Fish described in 1965
Taxonomy articles created by Polbot